Kebbel is a surname. Notable people with the surname include:

Arielle Kebbel (born 1985), American actress and model
T. E. Kebbel (1826–1917), English journalist